The Michigan Wolverines women's basketball team is the intercollegiate women's basketball program representing the University of Michigan. The school competes in the Big Ten Conference in Division I of the National Collegiate Athletic Association (NCAA). The Wolverines play home basketball games at the Crisler Center on the university campus in Ann Arbor, Michigan.

History 

Michigan began playing intercollegiate women's basketball in 1973–74, when inaugural head coach Vic Katch led the team to a 3–8 record (0–1 against Big Ten teams). There was no form of conference competition for the Wolverines until the 1976–77 season, and even then it was not officially sanctioned by the Big Ten until 1982–83. Michigan did not qualify for postseason play until earning an NCAA tournament bid in 1990 under head coach Bud VanDeWege, which would remain its only tournament appearance until Sue Guevara led the Wolverines to five straight postseason appearances (in both the NCAA and WNIT tournaments) between 1998 and 2002.

The team's best postseason performance in the NCAA Tournament is advancing to the Elite Eight, which it achieved for the first time in 2022. The Wolverines won the WNIT tournament in 2017, and have also reached the WNIT semifinals twice: in 2010 and 2015. Michigan has never won a Big Ten championship, either in the regular season or in the conference tournament. The closest it has come is 2nd in the regular season and tied for 3rd in the tournament, both accomplished during Guevara's tenure. Guevara was the most accomplished coach in the history of the program, leading all coaches in both wins and winning percentage for conference and overall games alike.

Since 2012, Michigan is coached by Kim Barnes Arico, the former St. John's Red Storm head coach and two-time Big East Coach of the Year. During a February 2017 game against Michigan State, the Wolverines set an attendance record of 12,707 in the first home sellout in program history, which more than doubled the previous record of 5,991. The second-largest home crowd (8,313) attended a January 2018 game against Ohio State. Later that same week, during the January 13th game against the Nebraska Cornhuskers, Katelynn Flaherty scored her 2,443rd point, surpassing Glenn Rice as the school's all-time leading scorer, man or woman. Flaherty would finish her career with a school-record 2,776 points.

During the 2017–18 season, Barnes Arico became the winningest coach in program history. On July 12, 2018, Barnes Arico signed a contract extension with the Wolverines through the 2022–23 season.

During the 2021–22 season, Michigan reached their highest ranking ever in the AP Poll at No. 4. On December 19, 2021, Michigan earned the program's first ever win over a top-five ranked team when they defeated No. 5 Baylor 74–68 in overtime. On January 31, 2022, Michigan earned their second ever win over a top-five ranked team when they defeated No. 5 Indiana 65–50.

Rivalries
 Michigan–Michigan State women's basketball rivalry
 Michigan–Ohio State women's basketball rivalry

Coaching staff
As of 2022-23 season.

Head coaching records 

Head coaching records through the end of the 2022-23 season

Honored players and coaches

Women's National Invitation Tournament MVP
2017 – Katelynn Flaherty

Big Ten Player of the Year
2021 – Naz Hillmon

Big Ten Freshman of the Year
1997 – Stacey Thomas
2019 – Naz Hillmon

Big Ten Defensive Player of the Year
2000 – Stacey Thomas

Big Ten Sixth Player of the Year
2015 – Katelynn Flaherty
2019 – Naz Hillmon

All-Americans
2021 – Naz Hillmon (USBWA, WBCA)
2022 – Naz Hillmon (AP, USBWA, WBCA)

Big Ten Coach of the Year
1990 – Bud VanDeWege
1998 – Sue Guevara
2000 – Sue Guevara 
2017 – Kim Barnes Arico
2022 – Kim Barnes Arico

WNBA Draft history

Statistical leaders

All-time leaders
Points: Katelynn Flaherty (2,776)
Rebounds: Naz Hillmon (1,063)
Assists: Siera Thompson (553)
Steals: Stacey Thomas (372)
Blocks: Trish Andrew (367)

Season leaders
Points: Katelynn Flaherty (774, 2016)
Rebounds: Cyesha Goree (367, 2015)
Assists: Siera Thompson (178, 2017)
Steals: Stacey Thomas (110, 1999)
Blocks: Trish Andrew (136, 1992)

NCAA tournament results
Michigan has appeared in eleven NCAA Tournaments, with a combined record of 11–11.

Arena 

Michigan has played its home games at Crisler Center (previously known as Crisler Arena) since it began intercollegiate play during the 1973–74 season.  The first women's basketball game played at Crisler took place on February 4, 1974 and saw the Western Michigan Broncos defeat Michigan 54–28. Crisler Arena was built in 1967 at a cost of $7.2 million, and has undergone three major renovations since, in 1998, 2001, and 2012. In 2002, the women's locker room was more than doubled in size and given a complete facelift. The 2012 renovation saw the addition of the William Davidson Player Development Center (WDPDC), a 57,000-foot basketball facility for both the women's and men's teams adjacent to the arena proper, and the renaming of the entire complex to Crisler Center. The first floor of the WDPDC houses two basketball practice courts, team locker rooms for both players and coaches, athletic medicine facilities, and an equipment room, while the second floor is home to offices for both the men's and women's coaching staffs and administrative functions, as well as rooms dedicated to recruiting, analyzing game film, and strength and conditioning. The 2012 renovation also resulted in major upgrades to the arena's infrastructure, a new scoreboard, replacement of all the seats in both the upper and lower bowls, more handicap-accessible seating, and major improvements to the arena's entrances and concourses. Completed in two separate phases, it cost $72 million in total.

References

External links